A Fire in the Cold Season is a 2019 Canadian thriller drama film, directed by Justin Oakey. The film stars Stephen Oates as Scott, an introverted trapper who has discovered a dead body, and Michaela Kurimsky as Mona, the dead man's pregnant widow. It received praise for its cinematography, intricate original score, as well as its "artful, genre-bending approach" to the backwoods thriller.

The film premiered on September 13, 2019 at the FIN Atlantic Film Festival. It subsequently had its international premiere in Iceland, and continued to screen at festivals during the COVID-19 pandemic, before a delated theatrical and digital release in Canada (October 2020). It has since been released internationally, in dozens of countries.

James Klopko received a Canadian Screen Award nomination for Best Cinematography at the 9th Canadian Screen Awards in 2021.

References

External links

A Fire in the Cold Season at Library and Archives Canada

2019 films
2019 drama films
Canadian crime drama films
Canadian thriller drama films
English-language Canadian films
Films shot in Newfoundland and Labrador
2010s English-language films
2010s Canadian films